Vidisha (विदिशा, formerly known as Bhelsa and known as Besnagar in ancient times) is a city in central Madhya Pradesh, India. It is located 62.5 km northeast of the state capital, Bhopal. The name "Vidisha" is derived from the nearby river "Bais", mentioned in the Puranas.

The district was created as Bhilsa District in 1904 by joining the tehsils of Vidisha (also known as Bhilsa) and Basoda (but not Basoda State) which were then part of Gwalior state. After India's independence in 1947, the former princely state of Gwalior became part of Madhya Bharat state, which was formed in 1948.

Vidishā was the administrative headquarters of Bhelsa, or Bhilsa, during the Medieval period. It was renamed Vidisha in 1956. Vidisha is also amongst the 112 Aspirational District in the Aspirational District Programme launched by NITI Aayog in 2018.

Demographics

As of the 2011 Census of India, Vidisha had a population of 155,959. Males constitute 53.21% of the population and females 46.79%. Vidisha has an average literacy rate of 86.88%, higher than the national average of 74.04%: male literacy is 92.29%, and female literacy is 80.98%. In Vidisha, 15% of the population is under 6 years of age.

History

Besnagar

The town is situated east of the Betwa River, in the fork of the Betwa and Bes rivers, 9 km from Sanchi. The town of Besnagar, 3 km from present-day Vidisha on the west side of the river, became an important trade centre in the 6th and 5th centuries BCE, under the Shungas, Nagas, Satavahanas, and Guptas, and was mentioned in the Pali scriptures. The Emperor Ashoka was the governor of Vidisha during his father's lifetime. His Buddhist Empress Vidisha Devi who was also his first wife, was brought up in Vidisha. It finds mention in Kalidasa's Meghaduta.

The ruins of Besnagar were inspected by Alexander Cunningham in 1874–1875. Remains of a large defensive wall were found on the western side of the city. Ancient Buddhist railings were also found just outside of the city, which had probably adorned a stupa. Numerous coins were found, including nine coins of the Western Satraps.

The Heliodorus Pillar is a stone column, which was constructed in about 150 BCE. This stone column was erected by the Greek ambassador of the Indo-Greek King Antialcidas, who came to the court of Bhagabhadra, a possible Sunga king. Dedicated to Lord Vāsudeva, this column was constructed in front of the temple of Vāsudeva. The pillar is situated about four kilometers away from the city on Vidisha-Ganj Basoda SH-14, located on the northern bank of the Vais River. It is a 20 feet and 7 inches tall stone pillar, commonly called Kham Baba. The script used in the inscription is Brahmi but the language is Prakrit, recording that Heliodorus erected the pillar as a Garuda Stambha to pay homage to Lord Vasudeva, who was later integrated as a manifestation of Lord Vishnu.

Emergence as Bhelsa

Besnagar was known as Bhelsa during the medieval period. It became famous for the temple of Sun god Bhillasvanin. It was ruled by the Later Gupta king Devagupta and Rashtrakuta king Krishna III. The name is first noted in an inscription of 878 AD by a merchant Hatiaka of Paravada community. The 12th century Tri-shashthi-shalaka-purusha-charitra mentions an image of Bhillasvamin at Vidisa, along with a copy of Jivant Swami buried in the sand. Minhajuddin's Tabaqat-i-Nusiri states that the temple was destroyed by Iltutmish in A D. 1233–34.

In 1293, Alauddin Khalji of the Delhi Sultanate sacked the city as a general of Sultan Jalaluddin. The attack was illustrative of Vidisha's importance in the medieval era. In 1532 Bhilsa was sacked by Bahadur Shah of Gujarat Sultanate. It then passed on to the Malwa Sultans, the Mughals and the Scindias.

Jainism in Vidisha 

Vidisha is considered to be Puranakshetras Jain tirtha. Vidisha is also believed to be the birthplace of Shitalanatha, the tenth tirthankar. There are 14 temples in Vidisha, among which Bada Mandir, Bajramath Jain temple, Maladevi temple, Gadarmal temple and Pathari Jain temple, built between 9th-10th centuries CE, are the most prominent. These temples are rich in architecture.

Climate

Historic places and monuments

Near the eastern edge of the old town are the remains of a large temple of the late Paramara period known as the Bijamaṇḍal. The building was probably started in the second half of the 11th century. That it was never finished is evidenced by the unfinished carved niches and architectural pieces found round the base of the temple plinth. On top of the plinth is a small mosque made using pillars, one of which has an inscription dating probably from the time of king Naravarman (circa 1094–1134). It is a devotional inscription revering Carccikā (i.e. Cāmuṇḍā), of whom he was a devotee. The miḥrāb suggests the mosque was constructed in the late 14th century. To one side of the Bijamaṇḍal is a store house of the Archaeological Survey of India containing many sculptures collected in the neighbourhood. A step-well of the 7th century is in the same campus and has, beside the entrance, two tall pillars with Kṛṣṇa scenes. These are the earliest Kṛṣṇa scenes in the art of central India. The dimensions of Bijamandal Temple at Vidisha are comparable to those of Konark in Orissa.

Lohangi Pir is a rock formation in Vidisha District that derives its name from Shaykh Jalal Chishti, a saint who was locally known as Lohangi Pir. This small domed building is a tomb, which has two Persian inscriptions on it. One of the inscriptions dates back to 1460 CE, while the other is from 1583 CE. The tank and a large bell-capital dating back to the 1st century BCE can be seen on the nearby hill. Near the tomb are the remains of a medieval temple that survived as a pillared crypt. These are dedicated to Goddess Annapurna. Lohangi is a large rock right in the heart of Vidisha, within walking distance of the railway station, is of religious and historical significance in the region.

Udaygiri is less than 10 km from Vidisha town. It is a series of at least 20 caves, containing both Hindu and Jain sculptures from the Gupta Era, sometime between the 4th and 5th century CE. According to Jain texts, Tirthankara Sheetal Nath attained nirvana here. It is basically a small hill where intricate sculptures have been cut out of the rocks.

Maladevi temple is a grand Portal of ninth century CE, situated on the eastern slope of a hill and built on a huge platform cut out of the hillside and strengthened by a massive retaining wall, Maladevi temple's imposing structure provides a panoramic valley view, in Gyaraspur, about 40 km from Vidisha along NH-86.

Hindola Torana - Hindola means a swing and Torana is an arched gate - is a magnificent artwork of the 9th century or medieval period, situated in Gyaraspur. It is a developed, ornamental and decorated arched gate made of sandstone. On both of its pillars, Lord Vishnu's ten incarnations are engraved. Near it, four carved and sculpted pillars and beams seem to be the ruins of Trimurthy temple set on one raised platform, as Lord Shiva, Lord Ganesha, Goddess Parvati and their servants are sculpted on these pillars and beams. The gate may be an entrance gate for a temple for Vishnu, Shiva or Thirumurthy.

Bajramath Temple is situated in Gyaraspur, on NH-146 behind the Sub-Judicial Magistrate and Tehsildar's Office. The temple faces the east,  and was a Hindu temple later transformed into a Jain temple. It is just opposite the hill on which Maladevi temple is situated.

Dashavtar Temple is situated on the north of the local lake, where ruins of a group of small Vaishnava shrines can be found. These small Vaishnava shrines are popularly known as Sadhavatara Temple. The temple comprises a large open pillared hall, in which the pillars are dedicated to the ten incarnations of Vishnu. These pillars date back from 8th to 10th century CE. Towards the western bank of the lake lie the ruins of sati pillars that date back to 9th or 10th century CE. One of these pillars is carved with four sculptured faces that depict a seated group of Hara-Gauri.

Girdhari Temple, which is known for its sculptures and fine carvings, is a popular attraction in Sironj. The ancient shrines of Jatashankar and Mahamaya are located close to this temple. Jatashankar Temple is situated 3 km towards the south-west of Sironj in the forest area. On the other hand, Mahamaya Temple is situated 5 km south-west of Sironj.

Udayeshwara Temple, located in Udaipur village of the Basoda Tehsil, is one of the most prominent Hindu shrines in the region. The inscriptions found in this temple suggest that the Udaipur Town was founded by the Parmara King Udayaditya during the 11th century CE. Other inscriptions found at the temple suggest that Parmara King Udayaditya dedicated it to Lord Shiva.

Vidisha District Museum

Vidisha Museum or Vidisha District Museum is the main museum of the city of Vidisha.

The museum has many sculptures, terracottas and coins, especially from the 9th to the 10th century CE, as well as Harrappan art.

Notable people 

Kailash Satyarthi - Born as Kailash Sharma, on 11 January 1954, in the Vidisha district.

Transport
Vidisha is a railway station on the Delhi-Chennai, Delhi-Mumbai main line of the Central Railway, at a distance of 54 km from Bhopal, the capital of Madhya Pradesh. Sanchi on the Jhansi-Itarsi section of the West Central Railway and Bhopal to Bina triple electrified broad gauge lines, from Bina to Katni double electrified Lines, Vidisha 102 km from Bina, and Vidisha, 9 km from Sanchi, are more convenient. Vidisha is also well-connected by road.

Education
Vidisha is well known for its educational institutions. Many of the primary and secondary schools are affiliated with the M.P. Board. Some schools choose to be affiliated with Central Board of Secondary Education (CBSE). There is a Grant-in-Aid Autonomous College called Samrat Ashok Technological Institute.

Atal Bihari Vajpayee Government Medical College, Vidisha is a medical college in Vidisha. It became functional in 2018 and received its first batch of students in the same year. The number of students admitted in 2018 was 150 whereas in 2019 the intake was increased to 180. Students are admitted to the college through NEET-UG examination.

References

 
 
 
 
 
 
 

 
Cities in Madhya Pradesh
9th-century Jain temples
Jain temples in Madhya Pradesh